Mithridates III Antiochus Epiphanes (flourished 1st century BC) was a prince who served as a King of Commagene.

Biography
Mithridates III was the son and successor of King Mithridates II of Commagene. He was of Iranian and Greek descent.

Mithridates III, sometime after 30 BC, had married his paternal cousin Iotapa, a Princess of Media Atropatene who was a daughter of Artavasdes I of Media Atropatene.

Iotapa bore Mithridates III one son called Antiochus III and two daughters both called Iotapa. One daughter called Iotapa married King Sampsiceramus II of Emesa, Syria and another Iotapa, later married and ruled with her brother Antiochus III.

When Mithridates III’s father died in 20 BC, he succeeded his father. He reigned as king between 20 BC–12 BC. Very little is known on his life and his reign. When he died in 12 BC, Antiochus III of Commagene became King.

References

Sources
 
 
 
 
 

Kings of Commagene
12 BC deaths
1st-century BC rulers in Asia
Year of birth unknown